The Noguera Pallaresa is a river in Catalonia, Spain.

It is named after the Pallars region.

Course
While the Garonne flows toward the Atlantic Ocean, the Noguera Pallaresa flows to the Segre, and enters that river from the right just before the reservoir of Camarasa (Noguera): its waters then flow to the Mediterranean. The Noguera Pallaresa is dammed at several points, including Talarn Dam, and the largest reservoirs are La Torassa (between Esterri d'Àneu and La Guingueta d'Àneu in the Pallars Sobirà), Sant Antoni (above Talarn in the Pallars Jussà), Terradets (in the municipality of Àger in the Noguera) and Camarasa (just above the confluence with the Segre).

Wildwater sports
Between the dam in the reservoir Panta de la Torrassa and the lake Panta de Sant Antoni the river is a favourite course for wildwater canoeing and rafting. During spring and summer the river falls dry at night, but in the morning the weir is opened and in several hours makes it a rather voluminous river with wild water class 2, 3 and 4 rapids. In the evening the weir is closed again.

See also 
 List of rivers of Spain
 Cabdella Lakes

Ebro basin
Rivers of Spain
Rivers of Catalonia
Pallars